The Four Thirds System is a standard created by Olympus and Eastman Kodak for digital single-lens reflex camera (DSLR) and mirrorless camera design and development.

The system provides a standard that, with digital cameras and lenses available from multiple manufacturers, allows for the interchange of lenses and bodies from different manufacturers.  seems to cover the standard. Proponents describe it as an open standard, but companies may use it only under a non-disclosure agreement.

Unlike older single-lens reflex (SLR) systems, Four Thirds was designed from the start to be entirely digital.  Many lenses are extensively computerised, to the point that Olympus offers firmware updates for many of them. Lens design has been tailored to the requirements of digital sensors, most notably through telecentric designs. The size of the sensor is significantly smaller than for most DSLRs and this implies that lenses, especially telephoto lenses, can be smaller. For example, a Four Thirds lens with a 300 mm focal length would cover about the same angle of view as a 600 mm focal length lens for the 35 mm film standard, and is correspondingly more compact. Thus, the Four Thirds System has crop factor (focal length multiplier) of about 2, and while this enables longer focal length for greater magnification, it does not necessarily aid the manufacture of wide angle lenses.

The image sensor format, between those of larger SLRs and smaller point-and-shoot compact digital cameras, yields intermediate levels of cost, performance, and convenience.

Sensor size and aspect ratio 

The name of the system stems from the size of the image sensor used in the cameras, which is commonly referred to as a 4/3" type or 4/3 type sensor.  The common inch-based sizing system is derived from vacuum image-sensing video camera tubes, which are now obsolete.  The imaging area of a Four Thirds sensor is equal to that of a video camera tube of 4/3 inch diameter.

The usual size of the sensor is 18 mm × 13.5 mm (22.5 mm diagonal), with an imaging area of 17.3 mm × 13.0 mm (21.63 mm diagonal). The sensor's area is about 30–40% smaller than APS-C sensors used in most other DSLRs, but still around 9 times larger than the 1/2.5" sensors typically used in compact digital cameras. Incidentally, the imaging area of a Four Thirds sensor is almost identical to that of 110 film.

The emphasis on the 4:3 image aspect ratio sets Four Thirds apart from other DSLR systems, which usually adhere to the 3:2 aspect ratio of the traditional 35mm format. However, the standard only specifies the sensor diagonal, thus Four Thirds cameras using the standard 3:2 aspect ratio would be possible; notably newer Panasonic Micro Four Thirds models even offer shooting at multiple aspect ratios while maintaining the same image diagonal.  For instance, the Panasonic GH1 uses a multi-aspect sensor designed to maximize use of the image circle at 4:3, 3:2, and 16:9; each ratio having a diagonal of 22.5 mm.

Sensor aspect ratio influences lens design.  For example, many lenses designed by Olympus for the Four Thirds System contain internal rectangular baffles or permanently mounted "petal" lens hoods that optimise their operation for the 4:3 aspect ratio.

In an interview John Knaur, a Senior Product Manager at Olympus, stated that "The FourThirds refers to both the size of the imager and the aspect ratio of the sensor".  He also pointed out the similarities between 4:3 and the standard printing size of 8×10 as well as medium format 6×4.5 and 6×7 cameras, thus helping explain Olympus' rationale on choosing 4:3 rather than 3:2.

Advantages, disadvantages and other considerations

Advantages 
The smaller sensor size makes possible smaller and lighter camera bodies and lenses. In particular, the Four-Thirds system allows the development of compact, large aperture lenses. Corresponding lenses become larger, heavier and more expensive when designed for larger sensor formats.
 Telecentric optical path means that light hitting the sensor is traveling closer to perpendicular to the sensor, resulting in brighter corners, and improved off-center resolution, particularly on wide angle lenses.
 Because the flange focal distance is significantly shorter than those on Canon FD, Canon EF, Nikon F and Pentax K, lenses for many other SLR types including the old Olympus OM System can be fitted to Four Thirds cameras with simple mechanical adapter rings. Such mechanical adapter rings typically require manual setting of focus and aperture.

Disadvantages 
 Compared to a larger sensor with equivalent pixel count, a Four Thirds sensor gathers disproportionately less light per pixel. Not only are the individual photosites smaller, but each loses more of its total area to support circuitry and edge shading than a larger photosite would. With less captured light to work with, each photosite requires additional amplification, with associated higher noise as well as reduced dynamic range. A telecentric lens design can mitigate this problem, but the sensor remains more sensitive to the angle of incoming light, and has more pronounced image corner light falloff.
 The resolution of a sensor is often measured as the total sensor pixel count in megapixels, and this is often a primary decision-making factor in choosing a camera. Smaller sensors are tougher to manufacture with the same pixel count as larger sensors, and place a greater demand on optics, since a lens must achieve greater absolute resolving power to produce an adequate picture on a smaller sensor, compared to a larger sensor of the same pixel resolution. A smaller pixel active area reduces the averaging effect and allows a better sampling of high spatial frequencies, mitigating this problem.
 To get the same angle of view as with a larger sensor, the focal length of the lens used with a Four Thirds sensor needs to be shorter. However, to get the same depth of field and light gathering capability as with a larger sensor, the lens aperture needs to be kept constant. In other words, the focal ratio of the lens must be smaller on the Four Thirds system to give the same depth of field and image noise. Since it is more difficult to produce faster lenses (lenses with smaller focal ratios), it can be difficult or impossible to find a lens that produces as shallow a depth of field, and gathers as much light, as an equivalent lens on larger formats. For instance, a 35mm "full-frame" DSLR can match the depth of field of a Four Thirds camera by closing down the aperture by two stops; but it may be more difficult or impossible for a Four Thirds System to match the shallow depth of field of a 35mm camera using a fast lens.

Differences 
 Most Four Thirds cameras (notably those manufactured by Olympus) use an aspect ratio of 4:3 rather than 3:2; newer models offer cropping to 3:2, but this results in a reduced image diagonal (i.e., the effective crop factor is then 2.08).

Four Thirds System companies 
As of the 2006 Photo Marketing Association Annual Convention and Trade Show, the Four Thirds consortium consisted of the following companies:
 Fuji
 Kodak
 Leica
 Olympus
 Panasonic
 Sanyo
 Sigma

This does not imply a commitment to end user products by each company.  Historically, only Leica, Olympus, and Panasonic have produced bodies. Olympus and Leica/Panasonic have made dedicated Four Thirds lenses, and Sigma makes adapted versions of their "DC" lenses for APS-C format DSLRs.  Kodak once sold sensors to Olympus for use in their Four Thirds bodies, but the newer Olympus Four Thirds cameras used Panasonic sensors.

Four Thirds System cameras 
The majority of Four Thirds System cameras and Four Thirds lenses are made by Olympus. Many Four Thirds cameras use "sensor-shift" in-body image stabilization, making the need for image stabilization technology in its lenses unnecessary. All Four Thirds cameras also incorporate an automatic sensor cleaning device, in which a thin glass filter in front of the sensor vibrates at 30 kHz, causing dust to fall off and adhere to a piece of sticky material below. Olympus' E-system camera bodies are noted for their inclusion of a wide range of firmware-level features and customization, good JPEG engine, and compact size. Because of the smaller format of Four Thirds, the viewfinders tend to be smaller than on comparable cameras.

Manufacture of Four Thirds cameras came to an end after the introduction of the mirrorless Micro Four Thirds format. Discontinued models include:

Leica Digilux 3
Olympus E-1
Olympus E-3
Olympus E-5
Olympus E-30
Olympus E-300
Olympus E-330
Olympus E-400
Olympus E-410
Olympus E-420
Olympus E-450
Olympus E-500
Olympus E-510
Olympus E-520
Olympus E-600
Olympus E-620
Panasonic Lumix DMC-L1
Panasonic Lumix DMC-L10

Four Thirds System lenses 

The Four Thirds lens mount is specified to be a bayonet type with a flange focal distance of 38.67 mm.

There are currently around three dozen lenses for the Four Thirds System standard.

Before announcing that it would stop production of Four Thirds lenses in early 2017, Olympus produced about 20 lenses for the Four Thirds System under their "Zuiko Digital" brand. They are divided into three grades — Standard, High Grade and Super High Grade.  High Grade lenses have faster maximum apertures, but are significantly more expensive and larger, and the Super High Grade zooms have constant maximum aperture over the full zoom range; all but the Standard grade are weather-sealed.  Lenses within each grade cover the range from wide-angle to super telephoto. The Zuiko Digital lenses are well regarded for their consistently good optics. The following table lists all Zuiko Digital lenses available at the time Olympus stopped Four Thirds production:

Olympus also made 1.4× and 2× teleconverters and an electronically coupled extension tube.

Sigma has adapted 13 lenses for the Four Thirds System, ranging from 10 mm to 800 mm, including several for which no equivalent exists: the fast primes (30 mm  and 50 mm ) and extreme telephoto (300–800 mm 5.6). As of 2014 all Sigma lenses for the Four Thirds System have been discontinued.

Leica has designed four lenses for the Four Thirds System: fast and slow normal zooms and a 14–150 mm super-zoom, all with Panasonic's image stabilization system, and an unstabilized  25 mm prime.  These are manufactured and sold by Panasonic.

An official list of available lenses can be found on Four-Thirds.org web site.

As for the system itself, it was silently discontinued in favor of the Micro Four Thirds System.

Micro Four Thirds System 

In August 2008, Olympus and Panasonic introduced a new format, Micro Four Thirds.

The new system uses the same sensor, but removes the mirror box from the camera design. A live preview is shown on either the camera's main liquid-crystal display or via an electronic viewfinder, as in digital compact cameras. Autofocus may be accomplished via a contrast detection process using the main imager, again similar to digital compact cameras. Some Olympus manufactured camera bodies also feature phase detection auto focus built into the sensor. The goal of the new system was to allow for even smaller cameras, competing directly with higher-end point-and-shoot compact digital cameras and DSLRs.  The smaller flange focal distance allows for more compact normal and wide angle lenses. It also facilitates the use, with an adapter, of lenses based on other mounting systems, including many manual focus lenses from the seventies and eighties.

In particular, Four Thirds lenses can be used on Micro Four Thirds bodies with an adapter; however, "all of the functions of the Micro Four Thirds System may not always be available."

See also 
Lenses for SLR and DSLR cameras
Lens mount — list of lens mounts
Video camera tube#Size, origin of 4/3 inch sensor measurement

References

External links

Official Four Thirds System site 
Four Thirds US patent 6,910,814; PDF version (1.7 MiB)
Andrzej Wrotniak's pages about the Four Thirds System — includes a complete lens list
Four Thirds User — independent site and user-community dedicated to the Four Thirds System, including Micro Four Thirds

 
Lens mounts
Photography equipment
Kodak
Olympus products
Japanese inventions